The 2013 Nigeria Entertainment Awards was the 8th edition of the ceremony. It was held at the Skirball Center for the Performing Arts in New York and hosted by Basketmouth.

Award winners

Music categories

Best Album of the Year
 Timaya Upgrade - Timaya
 Omo Baba Olowo - Davido
 YBNL – Olamide Empire Mates State of Mind - EME
 The Son of a Kapenta - Brymo
 R&BW - Banky W

Hottest Single of the Year
 "Kukere" - Iyanya "This Year" - Jaywon
 "Kokoma" -K9
 "Limpopo" -Kcee
 "Beat of Life (Samba)" - Sarz featuring Wizkid

Best New Act of the Year
 Sean Tizzle
 Ketchup
 Seyi Shay
 Burna Boy Ajebutter22
 Dammy Krane

Gospel Artist/Group of the Year
 Frank Edwards
 Onos
 Monique
 Funke Akinokun
 Sammy Okposo Bouqui

Best Pop/R&B Artist of the Year
 Praiz
 Banky W
 Wizkid
 Iyanya
 Davido Wande Coal

Best Rap Act of the Year
 Olamide
 Jesse Jagz
 Ice Prince Vector
 Phyno
 Ruggedman

Music Producer of the Year
 Spellz Masterkraft
 Chopstix
 Sarz
 Shizzi
 Fliptyce

Music Video of the Year
 "Tonight" - Burna Boy (Directed by Mex)
 "Sisi Eko" - Dare featuring Flavour (Directed by Mark Hofmeyr)
 "Skibo" - Solid Star (Directed by Clarence Peters)
 "Ghetto" - Shank (Directed by Patrick Elis) "Voice of the Streets" -Olamide (Directed by Mattmax)
 "Oliver Twist" - Dbanj (Directed by Sesan)

Most Promising Male Act to Watch
 SugaBoiz
 K9
 Bular
 Black Magic
 Endia Man
 Yung L

Most Promising Female Act to Watch
 Aramide
 Oyinkansola
 Lola Rae
 Emma Nyra Victoria Kimani
 Aura
 Lil Miss Miss
Niyola

Eastern African Artist or Group of the Year
 Camp Mulla
 Fally Ipupa
 K'naan
 Navio Radio & Weasel
 P-Unit

Western African Artist or Group of the Year
 Sarkodie Toofan
 Efya
 R2Bees
 Magic System
 Vivian Candid

Southern African Artist or Group of the Year
 Tear Gas
 AKA
 Zahara The Very Best
 Dama Do Bling
 Zone Fam

Best International Act
 Lil' Simz
 Fuse ODG
 Stylzz
 Sean CSA
 Tolumide
 JJCBest Indigenous Artist or Group
 Flavour N'abania
 Olamide Timaya
 Jaywon
 Kcee
 Reminisce

Best Collabo
 "Tony Montana" - Naeto C featuring D'banj
 "Bottom Belle" - Omawumi featuring Flavour
 "Emi na Baller" - Chidinma featuring  Suspect & IllBliss
 "Ghost Mode" - Phyno featuring  Olamide "Baddest Boy" - E.M.E
 "Without My Heart" - Tiwa Savage featuring  Don Jazzy

Film categories
Best Lead Actor in a Film
 OC Ukeje - Alan Poza
 Femi Jacobs - The Meeting
 Bimbo Manuel - Heroes & Zeros
 Ali Nuhu - Confusion Na Wa
 Hakeem Kae Kazim - Last Flight to Abuja
 Mike Ezuruonye - Friendly Scorpion

Best Lead Actress in a Film
 Joke Muyiwa - Ayitale
 Rita Dominic - The Meeting
 Uche Jombo - Mrs Somebody
 Genevieve Nnaji - Doctor Bello
 Omotola Jalade Ekeinde - Last Flight to Abuja
 Mercy Johnson - Facebook Babes

Best Supporting Actor in a Film
 Ali Nuhu - Blood & Henna
 Jide Kosoko - The Meeting
 Gabriel Afolayan - Heroes & Zeros
 Jim Iyke - Last Flight to Abuja
 OC Ukeje - Confusion Na Wa
 Alfred Atungu - Twin Sword

Best Supporting Actress in a Film
 Ebbe Bassey - Doctor Bello
 Belinda Effah - Kokomma
 Tunde Aladese - Confusion Na Wa
 Nse Ikpe Etim - Kiss and Tell
 Oge Okoye - Facebook Babes
 Tonto Dike - My Life My Damage

Best Film Director
 Charles Novia - Alan Poza
 John Uche - Bianca
 Niji Akanni - Heroes & Zeroes
 Nse Ikpe Etim - Kiss and Tell
 Tunde Kelani - Maami
 Kenneth Gyang - Confusion Na Wa
 Ifeanyi Ogbonna - Facebook Babes

Best Picture
 Confusion Na Wa
 Last Flight to Abuja
 The Meeting
 Heroes & Zeros
 The Twin Sword
 Alan Poza

Pan African Actor
 Chris Attoh - Single & Married
 Frank Artus - Heart of a Wife
 Majid Michel - The Groom's Bride
 Thomas Gumede - Otelo Burning
 David Mapane - Taxi Cop
 John Dumelo - Letters to my Mother

Pan African Actress
 Yvonne Okoro - The Contract
 Nadia Buari - Single and Married
 Yvonne Nelson - Single & Married
 Mbufung Seikeh - Ninah's Dowry
 Matshepo Maleme - A Million Colours
 Nolwazi Shange - Otelo Burning

Best International Actor
 Gbenga Akinnagbe
 Dayo Okeniyi
 Adewale Akinnuoye-Agbaje
 Emmanuel Akintunde
 Nonso Anozie
 David Oyelowo

Best International Actress
 Megalyn Echikunwoke
 Ashley Madekwe
 Caroline Chikezie
 Hope Olaide Wilson
 Adepero Oduye
 Judi Shekoni

Other awards
 Best TV Show
 Jara
 Moments with Mo
 Project Fame
 Sunrise Daily — Channels TV
 Idol
 Big Brother Africa

World DJ
 DJ Xclusive
 DJ Tunez
 DJ Sose
 DJ TTB
 DJ Spinall
 DJ Bayo

Best Comedian
 Senator
 Bovi
 Basketmouth
 Emeka Smith
 Seyi Law
 I Go Dye

Entertainment Promoters
 Shekpe Knights
 Big A
 Bigmoose Ent
 Stronghold Ent
 Coko Bar
 Empire Entertainment

Radio OAP of the Year
 YAW — Wazobia FM
 Freeze — Cool FM
 Tolu — Nigeria info
 Ajebo — Naija FM
 Gbemi - The Beat 99.9 FM
 Toke Makinwa - Rhythm 93.7 FM

TV Personality
 Denrele
 Adams
 Labi Layori
 Dolapo Oni
 Uti Nwachukwu
 Yvonne "Vixen" Ekwere

Entertainment Blog
 NotJustOk
 360Nobs
 Linda Ikeji
 BellaNaija
 Ndani TV
 Factory78

Entertainment Executive
 Gaga (YSG Ent)
 Ibaka TV
 Tony Nwakolor - 1805
 Ubi Franklin — Made Men Music
 Jason Njoku - iROKOtv
 Eric Idiahi - Spinlet

References

2013 film awards
2013 music awards
2013
Ent
Ent